Parasphaerasclera is a genus of soft coral. It is the only genus in the monotypic family Parasphaerascleridae.

Species 
The following species are recognized:

 Parasphaerasclera albiflora (Utinomi, 1957)
 Parasphaerasclera aurea (Benayahu & Schleyer, 1995)
 Parasphaerasclera grayi (Thomson & Dean, 1931)
 Parasphaerasclera kimberleyensis Bryce, Poliseno, Alderslade & Vargas, 2015
 Parasphaerasclera morifera (Tixier-Durivault, 1954)
 Parasphaerasclera nezdoliyi (Dautova & Savinkin, 2009)
 Parasphaerasclera rotifera (Thomson, 1910)
 Valdivian soft coral (Parasphaerasclera valdiviae (Kukenthal, 1906))
 Parasphaerasclera zanahoria (Williams, 2000)

References 

Parasphaerascleridae
Octocorallia genera